Valbondione is a comune (municipality) in the Province of Bergamo in the Italian region of Lombardy, located about  northeast of Milan and about  north of Bergamo. It is surrounded by the Orobie Alps.

The municipality of Valbondione contains the frazioni (subdivisions, mainly villages and hamlets) Fiumenero, Lizzola Alta, Lizzola Bassa, Bondione, Maslana, Gavazzo, and Dossi.

Valbondione borders the following municipalities: Carona, Gandellino, Gromo, Piateda, Ponte in Valtellina, Teglio, Vilminore di Scalve.

Demographic evolution

References